Tina Romero (born Tina Romero Alcázar, August 14, 1949) is an American actress. A native of New York City, Romero moved to Mexico in her youth, and later established a career there as an actress. Her early film roles included The Divine Caste (1973) and the title character in the horror film Alucarda (1977). She has also appeared in American films, including Missing (1982), opposite Sissy Spacek and Jack Lemmon.

Romero has also appeared in numerous Mexican television series, including numerous telenovelas, such as Rosalinda (1999), Mi pecado (2009), Quiero amarte (2014),

Early life
Romero was born on August 14, 1949, in New York City, the daughter of Mexican parents. She and her family relocated to Mexico in 1958 where she developed her skills in acting school. In 1976, at the age of 27, she made her debut as a protagonist in the movie Lo Mejor de Teresa. The same year she participated in the films Chin Chin el Teporocho and Las Poquianchis, directed by Felipe Cazals.

Career 
In 1977, she starred in her first mexican telenovela Santa, and starred in the film Alucarda, directed by Juan Lopez Moctezuma with Claudio Brook, David Silva, considered a classic horror film. In 1979 she filmed Cuatro mujeres y un Hombre, Bandera Rota and My Horse Cantador, and also appeared in the telenovela Angel Guerra alongside Andrea Palma and Diana Bracho.

Romero married in the 1980s to the Mexican film director Gabriel Retes, with whom she had two children.

In the 1980s she filmed Estampas de Sor Juana and in 1982 makes her Hollywood debut in the film Missing starring Sissy Spacek. In 1983 Romero returned to Mexico and made film and television appearances as  The Castaways of Liguria directed by her then husband Retes. In 1986 she starred in the film Miracles, and in 1988 returned to Hollywood to take part in Clif Ossmond's movie The Penitent. In México, she starred in the telenovelas La Casa al Final de la Calle and Simplemente María.

In the 1990s and 2000s she participated in such notable telenovelas as; Cadenas de Amargura (1991), Muchachitas (1991), Alondra (1995), Rosalinda (1999, with Thalía), Abrázame muy fuerte (2000), and most recently Pasión (2007), Mi pecado (2009) and Una Maid en Manhattan (2011), among others.

Filmography

Film

Television 
 Dama y obrero (American telenovela) (2013)- Alfonsina
 Rosario (2013) - Griselda
 Amor Bravío (Valiant Love) (2012)- Rosalio Sanchez (Mother of Alonso)
 Una Maid en Manhattan (Maid In Manhattan) (2011-2012) - Carmen "La Nana"
 Llena de amor (Fill Me With Love) (2010) - Paula
 Mi pecado (Burden of Guilt) (2009) -  Asuncion
 Verano de amor (Summer Of Love) (2009) - Pura Guerra
 El juramento (Secret Lies) (2008) - Silvia
 Pasión (Passion) (2007) - Criada
 Amarte así (Looking for Dad) (2005) - Evangelina Lizárraga
 El juego de la vida (The Game of Life) (2001) - Mercedes Pacheco
 Abrazame muy fuerte (Embrace Me) (2000) - Jacinta
 Rosalinda (1999) - Dolores Romero
 La mentira (Twisted Lies) (1998) - Irma Moguel
 La culpa (1996) - Lorena
 Alondra (1995) - Cecilia
 Buscando el paraíso (1994) - Elsa
 Mágica juventud (1992)
 Muchachitas (1991) - Verónica
 Cadenas de amargura (1991) - Martha Gastelum
 La hora marcada (episode "Por tu bien") - Carmen (1989)
 Simplemente María (1989) - Gabriela
 La Casa al Final de la Calle (1987) - Marina
 El Rincón de los Prodigios (1987)
 Aprendiendo a Vivir (1984) - Silvia
 Bella y Bestia (1979)
 Parecido al Amor(1979)
 Ángel Guerra (1979) - Dulcenombre
 Santa (1978) - Santa

References

External links
 
 Pagina de esmas.com
 Pagina de Alma-Latina.com

1949 births
Living people
Mexican telenovela actresses
Mexican television actresses
Mexican film actresses
Actresses from New York City
20th-century Mexican actresses
21st-century Mexican actresses
American actresses of Mexican descent
American emigrants to Mexico